Louise Henriette Wilhelmine of Brandenburg-Schwedt (24 September 1750 in Różanki – 21 December 1811 in Dessau), was a Margravine of Brandenburg by birth and by marriage a princess, and later Duchess, of Anhalt-Dessau.

Life 
Louise was the daughter of Margrave Frederick Henry of Brandenburg-Schwedt and his wife Leopoldine Marie (born Princess of Anhalt-Dessau) from the line Brandenburg-Schwedt the House of Hohenzollern. She was educated in Prussia, together with her sister, Friederike Charlotte of Brandenburg-Schwedt. Between 1760 and 1762, the mathematician Leonhard Euler sent her sister numerous letters in French about mathematical and philosophical subjects. These letters were published between 1769 and 1773 under the title Letters to a German Princess and were printed in Leipzig and St. Petersburg. The French edition was printed twelve times.

She married her cousin Leopold III of Anhalt-Dessau on 25 July 1767 in Charlottenburg. By this marriage, she was Princess, and later Duchess, of Anhalt-Dessau.

She was considered educated and well-read and was artistically gifted and was friends with famous artists, among them Angelica Kauffman, who painted some portraits of Louise. She travelled to England in 1775, and later to Switzerland and Italy.

Children
A daughter (b. and d. Dessau, 11 February 1768).
Frederick, Hereditary Prince of Anhalt-Dessau (b. Dessau, 27 December 1769 – d. Dessau, 27 May 1814).

References 
 Johanna Geyer-Kordesch (ed.): Die Englandreise der Fürstin Louise von Anhalt-Dessau im Jahre 1775, Nicolaische Verlagsbuchhandlung, Berlin, 2006, 
 Wilhelm Haefs, Holger Zaunstöck (ed.): Hof – Geschlecht – Kultur. Luise von Anhalt-Dessau (1750–1811) und die Fürstinnen ihrer Zeit = Das achtzehnte Jahrhundert, vol. 28, issue 2, Wallstein, Göttingen 2004, 
 Simone Hübner: Luise von Anhalt-Dessau — eine aufgeklärte Fürstin? Versuch einer Lebensbeschreibung  thesis, Humboldt University, Berlin, 1993
 William and Ulrike Sheldon (eds.): Im Geist der Empfindsamkeit. Freundschaftsbriefe der Mösertochter Jenny von Voigts an die Fürstin Luise von Anhalt-Dessau 1780–1808,  Wenner, Osnabrück, 1971

External links 
 

German duchesses
German princesses
House of Hohenzollern
1750 births
1811 deaths
18th-century German people
Duchesses of Anhalt
Princesses of Anhalt-Dessau
Royal reburials
Daughters of monarchs